The California Eagles were a professional indoor football team based in Stockton, California. The team was a member of the Western Conference of American Indoor Football (AIF) during the 2012 season. The Eagles played their home games at the Stockton Arena.  They are the third indoor team to play at Stockton Arena since the Stockton Lightning of af2 (2006-2009) and the Stockton Wolves (who were independent) (2011) and was preceded by the San Jose SaberCats of the Arena Football League in 2015 for that league's National Conference Championship game and Arena Bowl XXVIII.

History
The Eagles became an expansion member of the re-branded American Indoor Football for the 2012 season. The Eagles were brought in by owner Dan Whited. The Eagles began the season 3–2, when the team suspended operations due to Whited failing to meet financial obligations. However, the Western Conference champion, Ontario Warriors, were suspended by the AIF, and the Eagles were thrown into the AIF Championship Game to play the Eastern Conference champions, the Cape Fear Heroes. The Eagles were defeated by the Heroes, 79–27.

Statistics and records

Season-by-season results
Note: The Finish, Wins, Losses, and Ties columns list regular season results and exclude any postseason play.

* Season currently in progress

References

External links
 California Eagles official website
 American Indoor Football official Website

American football teams in California
Former American Indoor Football teams
Sports in Stockton, California
American football teams established in 2011
American football teams disestablished in 2012
2011 establishments in California
2012 disestablishments in California